Leonard Angus Smith (25 October 1882 – 29 July 1943) was an  Australian rules footballer who played with South Melbourne in the Victorian Football League (VFL). He also played two first-class cricket matches for Victoria in 1908.

See also
 List of Victoria first-class cricketers

References

External links 
 
 
 

1882 births
1943 deaths
Australian rules footballers from Victoria (Australia)
Sydney Swans players
Australian cricketers
Victoria cricketers
Cricketers from Melbourne
Australian Army personnel of World War II
Australian Army soldiers
Australian military personnel killed in World War II